Juan Serrano may refer to:

 Juan Pablo Serrano (born 1994), Argentine cyclist
 Juan René Serrano (born 1984), Mexican archer who competed in the 2004 Summer Olympics
 Juan Serrano (flamenco) (born 1935), Spanish flamenco guitarist
 João Serrão (died 1521), Spanish navigator who sailed with Ferdinand Magellan during the first circumnavigation of the world (1519–1521)
 Juan Yasser Serrano (born 1988), Cuban right-handed pitcher